Fragile Machine is an indie cyberpunk short film created by a team of artists called Aoineko.

Plot
Leda Nea is a scientist working for the Göln Remedios laboratory. Following the death of her daughter, Leda volunteers as a test subject in a series of experiments designed to mesh human and machine.

Reception
Fragile Machine was premiered at the Waterloo Festival for Animated Cinema in 2005

Fragile Machine was well received at various film festivals, winning accolades such as:

"Best Animated File Award (2005): The Sedona International Film Festival
"Special Tribute for Animation (2005): Imaginaria
"Honorable Mention for Work in Progress (2005): DIY Film Festival

Reviews of Fragile Machine were generally positive.  Brett D. Rogers of fps Magazine called the film "a well-styled piece of visual and audio cyberpunk, setting lessons learned from Blade Runner, Ghost in the Shell and Metropolis to a beat."

References

External links
  Official website
  Review at Cyberpunk Review
 
 

American animated short films
2000s American films